Weschler can refer to:

 Anita Weschler (1903–2000), American sculptor and writer
 Lawrence Weschler (born 1952), author of works of creative nonfiction
 Toni Weschler, author of the bestselling book on women's health and fertility, teacher of the system Fertility Awareness Method
 Noa Barak-Weshler
 Weschler Scales (disambiguation)

See also
 Related surnames
 Wäschler, Waschler
 Wäschle
 Similar forms
 Wechsler
 Wexler

German-language surnames
Jewish surnames
Yiddish-language surnames